Irene Gammel is a Canadian literary historian, biographer, and curator. She has published numerous books including Baroness Elsa, a groundbreaking cultural biography of New York Dada artist and poet Baroness Elsa von Freytag-Loringhoven, and Looking for Anne of Green Gables, revealing the hidden life of Canadian author L.M. Montgomery during the writing of her classic novel Anne of Green Gables.  Together with Suzanne Zelazo, Gammel published Crystal Flowers: Poems and a Libretto by Florine Stettheimer, and Body Sweats: The Uncensored Writings of Elsa von Freytag-Loringhoven, the first major English collection of the Baroness's poems. Both books were selected for the New York Times’ notable art books for 2011.

Gammel teaches at Toronto Metropolitan University in Toronto. She holds the Canada Research Chair in Modern Literature and Culture and is the Director of the Modern Literature and Culture Research Centre.

Gammel holds a PhD (1992) and MA (1987) in English from McMaster University, and a Staatsexamen's degree from the Universität des Saarlandes in Germany. She taught at the University of Prince Edward Island and held Visiting Professorships at the Friedrich-Schiller-Universität Jena and Erfurt Universität in Germany. She also served as the President of the Canadian Comparative Literature Association.  In 2009, she was elected a member of the Royal Society of Canada.

Exhibitions

Irene Gammel curated Anne of Green Gables: A Literary Icon at 100, a cross-Canada centennial exhibition in 2008. With June Creelman, she curated Reflecting on Anne of Green Gables, Souvenirs d’Anne… La maison aux pignons verts at the Library and Archives Canada.

Publications

Biography / Non-fiction

Looking for Anne: How Lucy Maud Montgomery Dreamed Up a Literary Classic. Toronto: Key Porter Books and New York: St. Martin's Press, 2008.
Baroness Elsa: Gender, Dada, and Everyday Modernity—A Cultural Biography. Cambridge: MIT Press, 2002.
Die Dada Baroness: Das wilde Leben der Elsa von Freytag-Loringhoven. Berlin: Ebersbach, 2003.

Criticism

Sexualizing Power in Naturalism: Theodore Dreiser and Frederick Philip Grove. Calgary: University of Calgary Press, 1994.

Edited books

Body Sweats: The Uncensored Writings of Elsa von Freytag-Loringhoven. Cambridge: MIT Press, 2011 (jointly with Suzanne Zelazo).
Crystal Flowers: Poetry and a Libretto by Florine Stettheimer. Toronto: BookThug, 2010 (jointly with Suzanne Zelazo).
Anne’s World: A New Century of Anne of Green Gables. Toronto: University of Toronto Press, 2010 (jointly with Benjamin Lefebvre).
I Got Lusting Palate: Dada Verse by Elsa von Freytag-Loringhoven. Berlin: edition ebersbach, 2005.
The Intimate Life of L.M. Montgomery. Toronto: University of Toronto Press, 2005.
Making Avonlea: L.M. Montgomery and Popular Culture. Toronto: University of Toronto Press, 2002.
Confessional Politics: Women's Sexual Self-Representations in Lifewriting and Popular Media. Carbondale and Edwardsville: Southern Illinois University Press, 1999.
L.M. Montgomery and Canadian Culture. Toronto: University of Toronto Press, 1999 (jointly with Elizabeth Epperly).

Honors and awards
2009, elected Fellow of the Royal Society of Canada

References

University of Prince Edward Island alumni
Canadian biographers
Canadian women non-fiction writers
Living people
Canada Research Chairs
Women biographers
Year of birth missing (living people)
Canadian women curators